Edward Scobell may refer to:

 Edward Scobell (naval officer) (1784–1825), English naval officer
 Edward Scobell (priest) (1850–1917), English Anglican priest